The dubious trumpet-eared bat (Phoniscus aerosa) is a species of vesper bat in the family Vespertilionidae.
It is found only in possibly South Africa.

References

Phoniscus
Mammals of South Africa
Taxonomy articles created by Polbot
Taxa named by Robert Fisher Tomes
Bats of Africa
Mammals described in 1858